Cédric Brunner (born 17 February 1994) is a Swiss professional footballer who plays as a right-back for Bundesliga club Schalke 04.

Career

Schalke 04 
On 7 July 2022, following the expiration of his contract with Arminia Bielefeld, Brunner signed a two year contract with Bundesliga club Schalke 04.

Career statistics

Honours
FC Zürich
Swiss Cup: 2015–16, 2017–18
Swiss Challenge League: 2016–17

Arminia Bielefeld
2. Bundesliga: 2019–20

References

External links
 Profile at the FC Schalke 04 website
 

1994 births
Living people
Association football defenders
Swiss men's footballers
Swiss Super League players
FC Zürich players
Arminia Bielefeld players
FC Schalke 04 players
Bundesliga players
2. Bundesliga players
Swiss expatriate footballers
Swiss expatriate sportspeople in Germany
Expatriate footballers in Germany